Oleksandrivka is one of the most popular names for populated places in Ukraine. There are over 100 localities in Ukraine named that way. 

It may refer to the following places in Ukraine:

Populated places

Urban settlements (towns)
Oleksandrivka, Kramatorsk urban hromada, Kramatorsk Raion, Donetsk Oblast, urban-type settlement in Donetsk Oblast
Oleksandrivka, Marinka Raion, Donetsk Oblast, urban-type settlement in Donetsk Oblast
Oleksandrivka, Oleksandrivka Raion, Donetsk Oblast, urban-type settlement in Donetsk Oblast
Oleksandrivka, Oleksandrivka settlement hromada, Kropyvnytskyi Raion, Kirovohrad Oblast, urban-type settlement in Kirovohrad Oblast
Oleksandrivka, Oleksandrivka settlement hromada, Voznesensk Raion, Mykolaiv Oblast, urban-type settlement in Mykolaiv Oblast
Oleksandrivka, Chornomorsk urban hromada, Odessa Raion, Odessa Oblast, urban-type settlement in Odessa Oblast

Villages
There are 103 villages in Ukraine named Oleksandrivka.
Oleksandrivka, Lyman urban hromada, Kramatorsk Raion, Donetsk Oblast, village in Donetsk Oblast
Oleksandrivka, Kherson Oblast, village in Kherson Oblast
, village in Zakarpattia Oblast

Rural settlements (hamlets)
Oleksandrivka, Zvenyhorodka Raion, a settlement in Cherkasy Oblast

Transportation infrastructure

Border checkpoint
 Oleksandrivka (border checkpoint), Kharkiv Oblast
 Oleksandrivka (border checkpoint), Luhansk Oblast

Railway station
 Oleksandrivka railway station, in Oleksandrivka, Oleksandrivka settlement hromada, Voznesensk Raion, Mykolaiv Oblast

See also
Alexandrovka (disambiguation)
Oleksandrivka Raion, various places
Velyka Oleksandrivka, town in Kherson Oblast